The rockpools of the British Isles are a feature of rocky shores and have a particular life of their own. Conditions within them are different from the open sea, as they are exposed to increased sunlight, as well as predation from land-based animals and accidental damage from tourism. Some, such as those in Wembury Marine Centre, are formally protected.

Animals

Fish

Common goby, Pomatoschistus microps
Giant goby, Gobius cobitis Not Ireland
Painted goby, Pomatoschistus pictus
Rock goby, Gobius paganellus
Sand goby, Pomatoschistus minutus
Two-spotted goby, Gobiusculus flavescens
Shanny, Lipophrys pholis
Long-spined sea scorpion, Taurulus bubalis
Five-bearded rockling, Ciliata mustela
Butterfish, Pholis gunnellus
Snake pipefish, Entelurus aequoreus
Tompot blenny, Parablennius gattorugine
Montagu's blenny, Coryphoblennius galerita
Small-headed clingfish, Apletodon dentatus  Not Ireland
Two-spotted clingfish, Diplecogaster bimaculata
Corkwing wrasse, Crenilabrus melops
Great pipefish, Syngnathus acus
Sea stickleback, Spinachia spinachia
Lumpsucker, Cyclopterus lumpus
Lesser weever, Echiichthys vipera
Common dragonet, Callionymus lyra

Molluscs

Cephalopods
Common cuttlefish, Sepia officinalis
Curled octopus, Eledone cirrhosa
Common octopus, Octopus vulgaris
Little cuttle, Sepiola atlantica

Scaphopods
Tusk shell, Antalis entalis

Gastropods

Keyhole limpet, Diodora apertura
Slit limpet, Eumarginula reticulata
Tortoiseshell limpet, Acmaea tessulata
Common limpet, Patella vulgata
Flat topshell, Gibbula umbilicalis
Thick topshell, Monodonta lineata
Common topshell, Calliostoma zizyphynum
Common periwinkle, Littorina littorea
Flat periwinkle, Littorina littoralis
Rough periwinkle, Littorina saxatilis
Dogwhelk, Nucella lapillus
Netted Dogwhelk Nassarius reticulatus
Common sea slug, Aeolidia papillosa
Jorunna nudibranch Jorunna tomentosa
Orange-clubbed nudibranch Limacia clavigera
Rough-mantled doris Onchidoris bilamellata 
Whip fan nudibranch Tritonia nilsodhneri 
Necklace moon snail, Euspira catena
 
Bivalves
Blue mussel, Mytilus edulis
Cockle, Cerastoderma edule
Rough cockle, Acanthocardia tuberculata
Prickly cockle, Acanthocardia echinata
Bean clam, Donax semistriatus
Golden banded wedge bean clam, Donax vittatus
Razor shell, Pharus legumen
Pod razorshell, Ensis ensis
Pod razorshell, Ensis siliqua
Thin tellin clam, Angulus tenuis
Baltic tellin clam, Macoma balthica
Ocean quahog, Arctica islandica
Venus clam, Dosinia lupinus
Venus clam, Chamelea striatula
Striped venus clam, Chamelea gallina
Smooth clam, Callista chione
Pullet carpet clam, Venerupis corrugata
Rayed trough clam, Mactra stultorum
Cut trough clam, Spisula subtruncata
Surf clam, Spisula solida
Otter clam, Lutraria lutraria
Otter clam, Lutraria angustior
Piddock, Pholas dactylus
European flat oyster, Ostrea edulis
Flat oyster, Ostrea lamellosa
Great scallop, Pecten maximus
Queen scallop, Aequipecten opercularis
Scallop, Aequipecten heliacus

Arthropods

Crustaceans

Sea slater, Ligia oceanica
Barnacles
Acorn barnacle, Semibalanus balanoides
Copepods
Tidepool copepod, Tigriopus brevicornis
Crabs
Broad-clawed porcelain crab, Porcellana platycheles
Edible crab, Cancer pagurus
Shore crab, Carcinus maenas
Common hermit crab, Pagurus bernhardus
European spider crab, Maja squinado
Small hermit crab, Diogenes pugilator
Velvet crab, Necora puber
Hairy crab, Pilumnus hirtellus
Circular crab, Atelecyclus rotundatus
Sandy swimming crab, Liocarcinus depurator
Masked crab, Corystes cassivelaunus
Short-legged spider crab, Eurynome aspera
Furrowed crab, Xantho incisus
Long-legged spider crab, Macropodia rostrata
Great spider crab, Hyas araneus
Long-clawed porcelain crab, Pisidia longicornis
Prawns and shrimp

Common prawn, Palaemon serratus
Rockpool prawn, Palaemon elegans
Brown shrimp, Crangon crangon
Lobsters and squat lobsters
Black squat lobster, Galathea squamifera
European lobster, Homarus gammarus
Scampi, Nephrops norvegicus

Insects
Springtail, Anurida maritima

Cnidarians

Sea anemones
Beadlet anemone, Actinia equina
Strawberry anemone Actinia fragracea
Snakelocks anemone Anemonia sulcata
Dahlia anemone Urticina felina
Elegant anemone Sagartia elegans 
Jellyfish
Common jellyfish, Aurelia aurita
Compass jellyfish, Chrysaora hysoscella
Lion's mane jellyfish, Cyanea capillata
Dustbin-lid jellyfish, Rhizostoma pulmo
Jellyfish, Rhizostoma octopus
Blue jellyfish, Cyanea lamarckii
Mauve stinger, Pelagia noctiluca
Hydrozoa
Sea fur, Obelia
Sea hedgehog hydroid, Halecium muricatum
Clava
Oaten pipes hydroid, Tubularia indivisa

Echinoderms

Starfish
 Common starfish, Asterias rubens
 Cushion starfish, Asterina gibbosa
 Spiny starfish, Marthasterias glacialis
 Common brittle star, Ophiothrix fragilis
 Serpent star, Ophiura ophiura

Sea urchins
Edible sea urchin, Echinus esculentus
Purple sea urchin, Paracentrotus lividus
Green sea urchin, Psammechinus miliaris
Purple heart urchin, Spatangus purpureus
Sea potato, Echinocardium cordatum

Worms
Green leaf worm, Eulalia viridis
Spirorbis boraelis
Aphrodita aculeata

Nemertea
Ribbon worm, Lineus longissimus
Ragworms, Nereididae
 Bloodworms, Glyceridae

Sponges
Breadcrumb sponge, Halichondria panicea
Purse sponge, Sycon raphanus

Bryozoa
Moss animal, Flustra foliacea
Sea-mat, Membranipora membranacea

Tunicates
Golden star ascidian, Botryllus schlosseri
Vase tunicate, Ciona intestinalis

Plants

Algae

Beanweed, Scytosiphon lomentaria 
Bootlace weed, Chorda filum
Dulse, Rhodymenia palmata
Grass kelp, Enteromorpha intestinalis
Green hairweed, Chaetomorpha linum
Maiden's hair, Ectocarpus siliculosus
Hen pen, Bryopsis plumosa
Landlady's wig, Ahnfeltia plicata
Peacock's tail, Padina pavonia
Sea lettuce, Ulva lactuca
Rockweed, Fucus distichus 
Sea noodle, Nemalion helminthoides
Sea oak, Halidrys siliquosa
Sea sorrel, Desmarestia ligulata
Thongweed, Himanthalia elongata
Velvet horn, Codium tomentosum
Bladder wrack, Fucus vesiculosus
Channelled wrack, Pelvetia canaliculata
Knotted wrack, Ascophyllum nodosum
Spiral wrack, Fucus spiralis
Rainbow wrack, Cytoseira tamariscifolia
Brown forking weed, Bifurcaria bifurcata
Coral weed, Corallina officinalis
Common green branched weed, Cladophora rupestris
Sea beech, Delessaria sanguinea
Sea cauliflower, Leathesia difformis
Sea cellophane, Monostroma grevillei
Prasiola stipitata
Punctaria latifolia
Oyster thief, Colpomenia peregrina

Lichens
Verrucaria morpha
Verrucaria mucosa

References

Related
Collections Botaniques de l'Université de Bourgogne
Rockpooling: The Guide to Finding Marine Creatures

External links
Encyclopaedia of Marine Life

Ecology of the British Isles
rockpool
Articles containing video clips